Spur 247 is a state highway spur in the community of Pyote in Ward County, Texas.

Route description
Spur 247 begins in Pyote at  Spur 57, the former route of  US 80 in the region. It travels northward along Pyote Street, crossing  RM 2355 before leaving the town. It then curves to the northeast to reach its northern terminus at  SH 115.

History
A previous route numbered Spur 247 was designated in San Antonio, Bexar County on November 19, 1951 from then-US 81 via South Alamo Street, Probandt Street, and Steves Avenue to then-US 181 on South Presa Street. This route was cancelled on March 18, 1960 as a majority of it was concurrent with US 87 and other routes.

Later that year, the current Spur 247 was designated on July 25, 1960 over the former route of SH 115 through Pyote, which was rerouted to the east to eventually connect with the newly constructed  I-20. The original southern terminus of Spur 247 was intended to be I-20; however, the terminus would later be redescribed as US 80 (now Spur 57).

Major intersections

See also
List of state highway spurs in Texas

References

247
Transportation in Ward County, Texas